Lars Pettersson may refer to:
 Lars Pettersson (canoeist), Swedish sprint canoer
 Lars Pettersson (ice hockey), Swedish ice hockey and bandy player
 Lars Pettersson (footballer), Swedish footballer